The Wampanoag , also rendered Wôpanâak, are a Native American people of the Northeastern Woodlands based in southeastern Massachusetts and historically parts of eastern Rhode Island, Their territory included the islands of Martha's Vineyard and Nantucket.

Today there are two federally recognized Wampanoag tribes:
 Mashpee Wampanoag Tribe
 Wampanoag Tribe of Gay Head (Aquinnah).

The Wampanoag language was a dialect of Massachusett, a Southern New England Algonquian language. At the time of their first contact with the English in the 17th century, they were a large confederation of at least 24 recorded tribes. Their population numbered in the thousands; 3,000 Wampanoag lived on Martha's Vineyard alone.

From 1615 to 1619, the Wampanoag suffered an epidemic, long suspected to be smallpox. Modern research, however, has suggested that it may have been leptospirosis, a bacterial infection that can develop into Weil's syndrome. The epidemic killed many people, profoundly affecting the Wampanoag population. Researchers suggest that the losses from the epidemic were so large that colonists were able to establish their settlements in the Massachusetts Bay Colony more easily. More than 50 years later, King Philip's War (1675–1676), led by Metacom, chief sachem of the Wampanoag people, and his allies against the colonists resulted in the death of 40 percent of the surviving tribe. Many male Wampanoag were sold into slavery in Bermuda or the West Indies, or on plantations and farms run by colonists in New England.

Historical records largely ignored the tribe after the late 18th century, although its people and descendants persisted. Some survivors continue to live in their historical homelands and maintain many aspects of their culture, while absorbing other peoples by marriage and adapting to changing economic and cultural needs in the larger society.

Name
Wampanoag is probably derived from Wapanoos, first documented on Adriaen Block's 1614 map, which was the earliest European representation of the Wampanoag territory. The word is a Lenape term for "Easterners" or literally "People of the Dawn", based on information provided by the people whom Block encountered in the lower Hudson Valley. It was first used by Increase Mather in 1676 to describe the alliance of tribes who fought against the English in King Philip's War. It was never the name of a tribe.

In 1616, John Smith correctly referred to one of the Wampanoag tribes as the Pokanoket. Pokanoket was used in the earliest colonial records and reports as the name of the tribe whose leaders (the Massasoit Ousemequin until 1661, his son Wamsutta from 1661–1662, and Metacom from 1662–1676) led the Wampanoag confederation at the time the English began settling southeastern New England. The Pokanoket were based at Sowams, near where Warren, Rhode Island, developed and on the peninsula where Bristol, Rhode Island, arose after King Philip's War. The Seat of Metacom, or King Philip's seat, at Mount Hope, in Bristol, Rhode Island, (now owned by Brown University) was the most sacred site of the Wampanoag people and became the political center from which Metacomet began King Philip's War, the first pan-tribal war of Native American resistance to English settlement in North America.

Wampanoag groups and locations

List

Culture

The Wampanoag people were semi-sedentary, with seasonal movements between sites in southern New England. The men often traveled far north and south along the Eastern seaboard for seasonal fishing expeditions, and sometimes stayed in those distant locations for weeks and months at a time. The women cultivated varieties of the "three sisters" (maize, climbing beans, and squash) as the staples of their diet, supplemented by fish and game caught by the men. Each community had authority over a well-defined territory from which the people derived their livelihood through a seasonal round of fishing, planting, harvesting, and hunting. Southern New England was populated by various tribes, so hunting grounds had strictly defined boundaries.

The Wampanoag had a matrilineal system, like many indigenous peoples of the Northeastern Woodlands, in which women controlled property, and hereditary status was passed through the maternal line. They were also matrifocal; when a young couple married, they lived with the woman's family. Women elders could approve selection of chiefs or sachems. Men acted in most of the political roles for relations with other bands and tribes, as well as warfare. Women passed plots of land to their female descendants, regardless of their marital status.

The production of food among the Wampanoag was similar to that of many American Indian societies, and food habits were divided along gender lines. Men and women had specific tasks. Women played an active role in many of the stages of food production and processing, so they had important socio-political, economic, and spiritual roles in their communities. Wampanoag men were mainly responsible for hunting and fishing, while women took care of farming and gathering wild fruits, nuts, berries, and shellfish. Women were responsible for up to 75 percent of all food production in Wampanoag societies.

The Wampanoag were organized into a confederation in which a head sachem presided over a number of other sachems. The colonists often referred to him as "king", but the position of a sachem differed in many ways from a king. They were selected by women elders and were bound to consult their own councilors within their tribe, as well as any of the "petty sachems" in the region. They were also responsible for arranging trade privileges, as well as protecting their allies in exchange for material tribute. Both women and men could hold the position of sachem, and women were sometimes chosen over close male relatives.

Pre-marital sexual experimentation was accepted, although the Wampanoag expected fidelity within unions after marriage. Roger Williams (1603–1683) said that "single fornication they count no sin, but after Marriage... they count it heinous for either of them to be false." Polygamy was practiced among the Wampanoag, although monogamy was the norm. Some elite men could take several wives for political or social reasons, and multiple wives were a symbol of wealth. Women were the producers and distributors of corn and other food products. Marriage and conjugal unions were not as important as ties of clan and kinship.

Language and revival

The Wampanoag originally spoke Wôpanâak, a dialect of the Massachusett language, which belongs to the Algonquian languages family. The first Bible published in America was a 1663 translation into Wampanoag by missionary John Eliot. He created an orthography which he taught to the Wampanoag. Many became literate, using Wampanoag for letters, deeds, and historic documents.

The rapid decline of Wampanoag speakers began after the American Revolution. Neal Salisbury and Colin G. Calloway suggest that New England Indian communities suffered from gender imbalances at this time due to premature male deaths, especially due to warfare and their work in the hazardous trades of whaling and shipping. They posit that many Wampanoag women married outside their linguistic groups, making it difficult for them to maintain the various Wampanoag dialects.

Jessie Little Doe Baird, a member of the Mashpee Wampanoag Tribe, founded the Wôpanâak Language Reclamation Project in 1993. They have taught some children, who have become the first speakers of Wôpanâak in more than a century. The project is training teachers to reach more children and to develop a curriculum for a Wôpanâak-based school. Baird has developed a 10,000-word Wôpanâak-English dictionary by consulting archival Wôpanâak documents and using linguistic methods to reconstruct unattested words. She has also produced a grammar, collections of stories, and other books. Mashpee High School began a course in 2018 teaching the language.

History 

Early contacts between the Wampanoag and colonists date from the 16th century when European merchant vessels and fishing boats traveled along the coast of New England. Captain Thomas Hunt captured several Wampanoag in 1614 and sold them in Spain as slaves. A Patuxet named Tisquantum (or Squanto) was bought by Spanish monks who attempted to convert him before setting him free. He accompanied an expedition to Newfoundland as an interpreter, then made his way back to his homeland in 1619—only to discover that the entire Patuxet tribe had died in an epidemic.

In 1620, the Pilgrims arrived in Plymouth, and Tisquantum and other Wampanoag taught them how to cultivate the varieties of corn, squash, and beans (the Three Sisters) that flourished in New England, as well as how to catch and process fish and collect seafood. They enabled the Pilgrims to survive their first winters, and Squanto lived with them and acted as a middleman between them and Massasoit, the Wampanoag sachem.

The Wampanoag suffered from an epidemic between 1616 and 1619, long thought to be smallpox introduced by contact with Europeans. However, researchers published a study in 2010 suggesting that the epidemic was leptospirosis, or 7-day fever. The groups most devastated by the illness were those who had traded heavily with the French, leading to speculation that the disease was a virgin soil epidemic. Alfred Crosby has speculated that the population losses were as high as 90 percent among the Massachusett and mainland Pokanoket.

Since the late 20th century, the event celebrated as the first Thanksgiving has been debated in the United States. Many American Indians and historians argue against the romanticized story of the Wampanoag celebrating together with the colonists. Some say that there is no documentation of such an event. There appears to be one primary account of the 1621 event written by a person who was present.

Massasoit became gravely ill in the winter of 1623, but he was nursed back to health by the colonists. In 1632, the Narragansetts attacked Massasoit's village in Sowam, but the colonists helped the Wampanoag to drive them back.

After 1632, the members of Plymouth Colony became outnumbered by the growing number of Puritans settling around Boston. The colonists expanded westward into the Connecticut River Valley. In 1638, they destroyed the powerful Pequot Confederation. In 1643, the Mohegans defeated the Narragansetts in a war with support from the colonists, and they became the dominant tribe in southern New England.

Conversion to Christianity 
After 1650, John Eliot and other Puritan missionaries sought to convert local tribes to Christianity, and those that converted settled in 14 "Praying towns." Eliot and his colleagues hoped that the Indians would adopt practices such as monogamous marriage, agriculture, and jurisprudence. The high levels of epidemics among the Indians may have motivated some conversions. Salisbury suggests that the survivors suffered a type of spiritual crisis because their medical and religious leaders had been unable to prevent the epidemic losses. 

Individual towns and regions had differing expectations for Indian conversions. In most of Eliot's mainland "praying towns," religious converts were also expected to follow colonial laws and manners, and to adopt the material trappings of colonial life. Eliot and other ministers relied on praise and rewards for those who conformed, rather than punishing those who did not. The Christian Indian settlements of Martha's Vineyard were noted for a great deal of sharing and mixing between Wampanoag and colonial ways of life. Wampanoag converts often continued their traditional practices in dress, hairstyle, and governance. The Martha's Vineyard converts were not required to attend church and they often maintained traditional cultural practices, such as mourning rituals.

The Wampanoag women were more likely to convert to Christianity than the men. Experience Mayhew said that "it seems to be a Truth with respect to our Indians, so far as my knowledge of them extend, that there have been, and are a greater number of their Women appearing pious than of the men among them" in his text "Indian Converts". The frequency of female conversion created a problem for missionaries, who wanted to establish patriarchal family and societal structures among them. Women had control of property, and inheritance and descent passed through their line, including hereditary leadership for men. Wampanoag women on Martha's Vineyard were the spiritual leaders of their households. In general, English ministers agreed that it was preferable for women to subvert the patriarchal model and assume a dominant spiritual role than it was for their husbands to remain unconverted. Experience Mayhew asked, "How can those Wives answer it unto God who do not Use their utmost Endeavors to Perswade and oblige their husbands to maintain Prayer in their families?" In some cases, Wampanoag women converts accepted changed gender roles under colonial custom, while others practiced their traditional roles of shared power as Christians.

Metacomet (King Philip) 

Massasoit was among those Indians who adopted colonial customs. He asked the legislators in Plymouth near the end of his life to give both of his sons English names. The older son Wamsutta was given the name Alexander, and his younger brother Metacom was named Philip. After his father's death, Alexander became the sachem of the Wampanoag. The colonists invited him to Plymouth to talk, but Wamsutta became seriously ill on the way home and died shortly after. The Wampanoag were told that he died of fever, but many Indians thought that he had been poisoned. The following year, his brother Philip (Metacom) became sachem of the Wampanoag.

Under Philip's leadership, the relationship changed dramatically between the Wampanoag and the colonists. Philip believed that the ever-increasing colonists would eventually take over everything—not only land, but also their culture, their way of life, and their religion, and he decided to limit the further expansion of colonial settlements. The Wampanoag numbered only 1,000, and Philip began to visit other tribes to build alliances among those who also wanted to push out the colonists. At that time, the number of colonists in southern New England already numbered more than double that of the Indians—35,000 vs. 15,000. In 1671, Philip was called to Taunton, Massachusetts, where he listened to the accusations of the colonists and signed an agreement that required the Wampanoag to give up their firearms. To be on the safe side, he did not take part in the subsequent dinner. His men never delivered their weapons.

Philip gradually gained the Nipmuck, Pocomtuc, and Narragansett as allies, and the beginning of the uprising was first planned for the spring of 1676. In March 1675, however, John Sassamon was murdered. Sassamon was a Christian Indian raised in Natick, one of the "praying towns." He was educated at Harvard College and had served as a scribe, interpreter, and counselor to Philip and the Wampanoag. But, a week before his death, Sassamon reported to Plymouth governor Josiah Winslow that Philip was planning a war against the colonists.

Sassamon was found dead under the ice of Assawompsett Pond a week later; three Wampanoag warriors were accused of his murder by a Christian Indian and taken captive by the colonists; they were hanged in June 1675 after a trial by a jury of 12 colonists and six Christian Indians. This execution was a catalyst for war, combined with rumors that the colonists wanted to capture Philip. Philip called a council of war on Mount Hope; most Wampanoag wanted to follow him, with the exception of the Nauset on Cape Cod and the small groups on the offshore islands. Allies included the Nipmuck, Pocomtuc, and some Pennacook and eastern Abenaki from farther north. The Narragansett remained neutral at the beginning of the war.

King Philip's War 

On June 20, 1675, some Wampanoag attacked colonists in Swansea, Massachusetts, and laid siege to the town; they destroyed it completely five days later, leading ultimately to King Philip's War. The united tribes in southern New England attacked 52 of 90 colonial settlements, and partially burned them down.

At the outbreak of the war, many Indians offered to fight with the colonists against King Philip and his allies, serving as warriors, scouts, advisers, and spies. Mistrust and hostility eventually caused the colonists to discontinue Indian assistance, even though they were invaluable in the war. The Massachusetts government moved many Christian Indians to Deer Island in Boston Harbor, in part to protect the "praying Indians" from vigilantes, but also as a precautionary measure to prevent rebellion and sedition from them. Mary Rowlandson's The Sovereignty and Goodness of God is an account of her months of captivity by the Wampanoag during King Philip's War in which she expressed shock at the cruelties from Christian Indians.

From Massachusetts, the war spread to other parts of New England. The Kennebec, Pigwacket (Pequawkets), and Arosaguntacook from Maine joined in the war against the colonists. The Narragansetts of Rhode Island gave up their neutrality after the colonists attacked one of their fortified villages. The Narragansetts lost more than 600 people and 20 sachems in the battle which became known as the "Great Swamp Massacre". Their leader Canonchet was able to flee and led a large group of Narragansett warriors west to join King Philip's warriors.

The war turned against Philip in the spring of 1676, following a winter of hunger and deprivation. The colonial troops set out after him, and Canonchet was taken captive and executed by a firing squad. Canonchet's corpse was quartered, and his head was sent to Hartford, Connecticut, to be put on public display.

During the summer months, Philip escaped from his pursuers and went to a hideout on Mount Hope in Rhode Island. Colonial forces attacked in August, killing and capturing 173 Wampanoags. Philip barely escaped capture, but his wife and their nine-year-old son were captured and put on a ship at Plymouth; they were then sold as slaves in the West Indies. On August 12, 1676, colonial troops surrounded Philip's camp, and soon shot and killed him.

Consequences of the war 
With the death of Metacomet and most of their leaders, the Wampanoags were nearly exterminated; only about 400 survived the war. The Narragansetts and Nipmucks suffered similar rates of losses, and many small tribes in southern New England were finished. In addition, many Wampanoag were sold into slavery. Male captives were generally sold to slave traders and transported to the West Indies, Bermuda, Virginia, or the Iberian Peninsula. The colonists used the women and children as slaves or indentured servants in New England, depending on the colony. Massachusetts resettled the remaining Wampanoags in Natick, Wamesit, Punkapoag, and Hassanamesit, four of the original 14 praying towns. These were the only ones to be resettled after the war. Overall, approximately 5,000 Indians (40 percent of their population) and 2,500 colonists (5 percent) were killed in King Philip's War.

18th to 20th century

Mashpee 
The exception to relocation was the coastal islands' Wampanoag groups, who had stayed neutral through the war.  The colonists forced the Wampanoag of the mainland to resettle with the Saconnet (Sekonnet), or with the Nauset into the praying towns in Barnstable County. Mashpee is the largest Indian reservation set aside in Massachusetts, and is located on Cape Cod. In 1660, the colonists allotted the natives about  there, and beginning in 1665 they had self-government, adopting an English-style court of law and trials. The area was integrated into the district of Mashpee in 1763.

In 1788 after the American Revolutionary War, the state revoked the Wampanoag ability to self-govern, considering it a failure. It appointed a supervisory committee consisting of five European-American members, with no Wampanoag. In 1834, the state returned a certain degree of self-government to the First Nations People, and although the First Nations People were far from autonomous, they continued in this manner. The state passed laws to try to control white encroachment on the reservation; some stole wood from its forests. A large region, once rich in wood, fish and game, it was considered highly desirable by the whites. With competition between whites and the Wampanoag, conflicts were more frequent than for more isolated native settlements elsewhere in the state.

Wampanoag on Martha's Vineyard 
On Martha's Vineyard in the 18th and 19th centuries, there were three reservations—Chappaquiddick, Christiantown and Gay Head. The Chappaquiddick Reservation was part of a small island of the same name and was located on the eastern point of that island. As the result of the sale of land in 1789, the natives lost valuable areas, and the remaining land was distributed among the Indian residents in 1810. In 1823 the laws were changed, in order to hinder those trying to get rid of the natives and to implement a visible beginning of a civic organization. Around 1849, they owned  of infertile land, and many of the residents moved to nearby Edgartown, so that they could practice a trade and obtain some civil rights.

Christiantown was originally a "praying town" on the northwest side of Martha's Vineyard, northwest of Tisbury. The land, kept under community ownership, yielded very few crops and the tribe members left it to get paying jobs in the cities. Wampanoag oral history tells that Christiantown was wiped out in 1888 by a smallpox epidemic.

The third reservation on Martha's Vineyard was constructed in 1711 by the New England Company (founded in 1649) to Christianize the natives. They bought land for the Gay Head natives who had lived there since before 1642. There was considerable dispute about how the land should be cultivated, as the colony had leased the better sections to the whites at low interest. The original goal of creating an undisturbed center for missionary work was quickly forgotten. The state finally created a reservation on a peninsula on the western point of Martha's Vineyard and named it Gay Head. This region was connected to the main island by an isthmus; it enabled the isolation desired by the Wampanoag. In 1849 they had  there, of which 500 acres were distributed among the tribe members. The rest was communal property. In contrast to the other reservation groups, the tribe had no guardian or headman. When they needed advice on legal questions, they asked the guardian of the Chappaquiddick Reservation, but other matters they handled themselves. The band used usufruct title, meaning that members had no legal claim to their land and allowed the tribal members free rein over their choice of land, as well as over cultivation and building, in order to make their ownership clear. They did not allow whites to settle on their land.  They made strict laws regulating membership in the tribe. As a result, they were able to strengthen the groups' ties to each other, and they did not lose their tribal identity until long after other groups had lost theirs.

The Wampanoag on Nantucket Island were almost completely destroyed by an unknown plague in 1763; the last Nantucket Wampanoag died in 1855.

Current status

Slightly more than 2,000 Wampanoag are counted as enrolled members of the nation today (many have ancestry including other tribes and races), and many live near the reservation (Watuppa Wampanoag Reservation) on Martha's Vineyard, in Dukes County. It is located in the town of Aquinnah (formerly known as Gay Head), at the extreme western part of the island.

Today, there are two federally recognized Wampanoag tribes and no state-recognized Wampanoag tribes. There are numerous unrecognized tribes who identify as being Wampanoag. The Massachusetts' Commission on Indian Affairs works with some of these organizations.

Some genealogy experts testified that some of the tribes did not demonstrate the required continuity since historic times. For instance, in his testimony to the Bureau of Indian Affairs, the historian Francis Hutchins said that the Mashpee "were not an Indian tribe in the years 1666, 1680, 1763, 1790, 1834, 1870, and 1970, or at any time between 1666 and 1970." In his opinion, an Indian tribe was "an entity composed of persons of American Indian descent, which entity possesses distinct political, legal, cultural attributes, which attributes have descended directly from aboriginal precursors." Without accounting for cultural change, adaptation, and the effects of non-Indian society, Hutchins argued the Mashpee were not an Indian tribe historically because they adopted Christianity and non-Indian forms of dress and appearance, and chose to remain in Massachusetts as "second-class" citizens rather than emigrating westward (note: to Indian Territory) to "resume tribal existence." Hutchins also noted that they intermarried with non-Indians to create a "non-white" or "colored" community. Hutchins appeared to require unchanged culture, including maintenance of a traditional religion and essentially total social autonomy from non-Indian society."

Federally recognized Wampanoag tribes

Mashpee Wampanoag Tribe 

The Mashpee Wampanoag Tribe consists of more than 1,400 enrolled members who must meet defined membership requirements including lineage, community involvement and reside within 20 miles of Mashpee. Since 1924 they have held an annual powwow at the beginning of July in Mashpee.  The Mashpee Wampanoag Tribal Council was established in 1972 under the leadership of its first president, Russell "Fast Turtle" Peters. In 1974 the Council petitioned the Bureau of Indian Affairs for recognition. In 1976 the tribe sued the Town of Mashpee for the return of ancestral homelands. The case was lost but the tribe continued to pursue federal recognition for three decades.

In 2000 the Mashpee Wampanoag council was headed by chairman Glenn Marshall.  Marshall led the group until 2007 when it was disclosed that he had a prior conviction for rape, had lied about having a military record and was under investigation associated for improprieties associated with the tribe's casino lobbying efforts. Marshall was succeeded by tribal council vice- chair Shawn Hendricks.  He held the position until Marshall pleaded guilty in 2009 to federal charges of embezzling, wire fraud, mail fraud, tax evasion and election finance law violations.  He steered tens of thousands of dollars in illegal campaign contributions to politicians through the tribe's hired lobbyist Jack Abramoff, who was convicted of numerous charges in a much larger scheme.  Following the arrests of Abramoff and Marshall, the newly recognized Mashpee Tribe led by new chair Shawn Hendricks, continued to work with Abramoff lobbyist colleague Kevin A. Ring pursuing their Indian gaming-related interests. Ring was subsequently convicted on corruption charges linked to his work for the Mashpee band. Tribal elders who had sought access to the tribal council records detailing the council's involvement in this scandal via a complaint filed in Barnstable Municipal Court were shunned by the council and banned them from the tribe for seven years.

In 2009 the tribe elected council member Cedric Cromwell to the position of council chair and president.  Cromwell ran a campaign based on reforms and distancing himself from the previous chairmen, even though he had served as a councilor for the prior six years during which the Marshall and Abramoff scandals took place – including voting for the shunning of tribe members who tried to investigate. A challenge to Cromwell's election by defeated candidates following allegations of tampering with voting and enrollment records was filed with the Tribal Court, and Cromwell's administration has been hampered by a series of protest by Elders over casino-related finances.

The Mashpee Wampanoag tribal offices are located in Mashpee on Cape Cod. After decades of legal disputes, the Mashpee Wampanoag obtained provisional recognition as an Indian tribe from the Bureau of Indian Affairs in April 2006, and official Federal recognition in February 2007. Tribal members own some land, as well as land held in common by Wampanoag descendants at both Chapaquddick and Christiantown.  Descendants have also purchased land in Middleborough, Massachusetts, upon which the tribe under Glenn A. Marshall's leadership had lobbied to build a casino.  The tribe has moved its plans to Taunton, Massachusetts, but their territorial rights have been challenged by the Pocasset Wampanoag.

But Indian gaming operations are regulated by the National Indian Gaming Commission established by the Indian Gaming Regulatory Act.  It contains a general prohibition against gaming on lands acquired into trust after October 17, 1988. The tribe's attempts to gain approvals have been met with legal and government approval challenges.

The Wampanoag Tribe's plan as of 2011 had agreement for financing by the Malaysian Genting Group and has the political support of Massachusetts Senator John Kerry, Massachusetts Governor Deval Patrick, and former Massachusetts Congressman Bill Delahunt, who is working as a lobbyist to represent the casino project. Both Kerry and Delahunt received campaign contributions from the Wampanoag Tribe in transactions authorized by Glenn Marshall as part of the Abramoff lobbying scandal.

In November 2011, the Massachusetts legislature passed a law to license up to three sites for gaming resort casinos and one for a slot machine parlor. The Wampanoag are given a "headstart" to develop plans for a casino in southeastern part of the state.

A December 2021 ruling from the United States Department of the Interior gives the Mashpee Wampanoag "substantial control" over 320 acres on Cape Cod. The Obama administration had put the land in federal trust, but the Trump administration reversed that decision. A federal judge blocked that action and the federal government appealed, but the Biden administration dropped the appeal.

Wampanoag Tribe of Gay Head (Aquinnah) 

The Wampanoag Tribe of Gay Head (Aquinnah) are headquartered in Aquinnah, Massachusetts. Aquinnah translates as "land under the hill.") They are the only Wampanoag tribe to have a formal land-in-trust reservation, which is located on Martha's Vineyard. In 1972, Aquinnah Wampanoag descendants formed the Wampanoag Tribal Council of Gay Head, Inc., to achieve self-determination and federal recognition. The Bureau of Indian Affairs recognized the tribe in 1987. The tribe has 1,121 enrolled citizens.

Gladys Widdiss, an Aquinnah Wampanoag tribal historian and potter, served as the President of the Wampanoag Tribe of Gay Head from 1978 to 1987. The Aquinnah Wampanoag Tribe of Gay Head won federal recognition from the United States government during her tenure. Under Widdis, the Aquinnah Wampanoag also acquired the Herring Creek, the Gay Head Cliffs, and the cranberry bogs surrounding Gay Head (now called Aquinnah) during her presidency.

The Aquinnah Wampanoag are led by tribal council chair Cheryl Andrews-Maltais, who was elected to the post in November 2007. In 2010, Andrews-Maltais put forward plans for the development of an Aquinnah reservation casino, which was met with opposition by state and local officials.

Other Wampanoag organizations

Herring Pond Wampanoag Tribe 
The Herring Pond Wampanoag Tribe, headed by tribal council chair Melissa Ferretti, is state recognized. Historically one of the "praying towns" set up in the colonial era by The Commonwealth of Massachusetts, they are involved in the Wampanoag Language Reclamation Project. In 1924 they helped organize the annual powwow at the beginning of July, which is now hosted in Mashpee. The first few powwows were held at the Herring Pond Wampanoag Meetinghouse before expanding and moving to Mashpee. The Mashpee Wampanoag and Herring Pond both petitioned at the same time to the Bureau of Indian Affairs for recognition. They maintain offices in Buzzards Bay, Massachusetts. The Herring Pond Tribe claims a territory that ranges from the Plymouth (Plimouth Colony) areas to the upper parts of Cape Cod (Bourne, Sandwich, and Plymouth). In December 2018, ownership of a six-acre historical burial ground in Plymouth, Massachusetts was transferred to the Herring Pond Wampanoag Tribe.

Assawompsett-Nemasket Band of Wampanoags 

The Assawompsett-Nemasket Wampanoag territory is known today as Lakeville and Middleboro Massachusetts. The Assawompsett-Nemasket today have recognition within the commonwealth. They are the direct lineal descendants of Wattuspaquin the black Sachem of Assawompsett and Mionamie, Daughter of Supreme Sachem Ousameequin who greeted the first English settlers in continental North America. Throughout the 18th,19th and 20th centuries the headquarters of the band was located at Nateawahmet or the Betty's Neck Reservation on Assawompset Pond. By the mid twentieth century the band was led by Chief Misqui'pinoquet, Red Blanket, Clarence Wixon Jr. He and his brother Nea'keahammuk Clinton Wixon founded the Algonquian Indian Center in Brockton, Massachusetts and were influential in the founding of the Boston Indian Council. After the passing of Chief Red Blanket his son Darrel Wixon or Pumaquoshim "Dancing Wolf", was made chief.

(ANBOW) or Assawompsett-Nemasket Band of Wampanoags is lead today by elected officials such as a principal chief and council board.

The Royal Wampanoag Cemetery located at 487 Bedford Street in Lakeville is a historical cemetery managed by the band. The tribe hosts an annual Summer Social Powwow on its reservation in July.

Pocasset Wampanoag Tribe (Pokonoket) 
The Pocasset Wampanoag band has held lands in Fall River, Massachusetts, since colonial times. They are the descendants and heirs of the Indians described in a deed from Benjamin Church dated November 1, 1709. Their government is organized under a traditional, clan-based system. They manage a 201.2 acre reservation in Fall River recognized under international law via the 1713 Treaty of Portsmouth and the 1725 Treaty of Boston. These treaties were entered into after Queen Anne's War, following raids such as those at Deerfield and Haverhill.

In 1869, the Commonwealth of Massachusetts passed the "enfranchisement act". This act dissolved reservation status for lands held by the tribes, replacing it with fee-simple property allocated to individual Indians upon application of any member of that tribe to the judge of probate in the county that the lands were located. The Pocassets resisted the enfranchisement act and previous attempts to divide the reserve into smaller parcels. In the late 20th century, they resisted an attempt to have their lands put into federal trust, managing to keep them intact. The tribe has members living throughout Southeastern Massachusetts. They applied for federal recognition in 1995 but were turned down.

Other groups 
Numerous other unrecognized groups identify as being Wampanoag. These include:
 Assawompsett-Nemasket Band of Wampanoags
 Assonet Band of Wampanoags
 Cape Sable Island Wampanoag
 Chappaquiddick Wampanoag Tribe
 Council of Seven; Royal House of Pokanoket; Pokanoket Tribe; Wampanoag Nation
 Pocasset Wampanoag Tribe of Massachusetts and Rhode Island
 Pokanoket Tribe of the Wampanoag Nation (in Massachusetts and Rhode Island)
 Pokanoket-Wampanoag Federation: Wampanoag Nation/Pokanoket Tribe and Bands
 Ponkapoag Tribal Council
 Seaconke Wampanoag Tribe

Demographics

Notable historical Wampanoag people
Note: Contemporary people are listed under their specific tribes.
 Crispus Attucks, first man killed in Boston Massacre
 Caleb Cheeshahteaumuck, the first American Indian to graduate from Harvard College
 Corbitant, 17th-century sachem of the Pocasset
 Massasoit, the sachem who befriended the Mayflower pilgrims
 Metacom or Metacomet, Massasoit's second son, also called Philip, who initiated King Philip's War (1675–1676)
 John Sassamon, early translator
 Wamsutta, Massasoit's oldest son, also known as Alexander
 Weetamoo of the Pocasset, a woman who supported Metacom and drowned crossing the Taunton River during King Philip's War; one of her husbands was Wamsutta, a brother to King Phillip (Metacom)

Representation in other media
 Tashtego was a fictional Wampanoag harpooneer from Gay Head in Herman Melville's novel Moby Dick.
 Wampanoag history from 1621 to King Philip's War is depicted in the first part of We Shall Remain, a 2009 documentary.

See also 
 The City of Columbus was an 1884 shipwreck where a group of Wampanoag risked their lives to save passengers
 Cuttyhunk
 Federally recognized tribes
 List of early settlers of Rhode Island
 Native American tribes in Massachusetts
 Old Indian Meeting House, 1684 church
 State recognized tribes in the United States

Citations

References 
 Bragdon, Kathleen. "Gender as a Social Category in Native Southern New England". American Society for Ethnohistory, Ethnohistory 43:4. Autumn 1996. . .
 Plane, Anne Marie. Colonial Intimacies: Indian Marriage in Early New England. Ithaca, NY: Cornell University Press, 2000.
 
 Salisbury, Neal. Manitou and Providence. (Oxford: Oxford University Press), 1982.
 Leach, Douglas Edward. Flintlock and Tomahawk. New York: W. W. Norton. , 1958.
 Ronda, James P. "Generations of Faith: The Christian Indians of Martha's Vineyard." William and Mary Quarterly 38, 1981. . .
 Salisbury, Neal. Introduction to The Sovereignty and Goodness of God by Mary Rowlandson. Boston: Bedford Books, 1997.
 Salisbury, Neal. Manitou and Providence. Oxford: Oxford University Press, 1982.
 Salisbury, Neal, and Colin G. Calloway, eds. Reinterpreting New England Indians and the Colonial Experience. Vol. 71 of Publications of the Colonial Society of Massachusetts. Boston: University of Virginia Press, 1993.

Further reading 
 Lepore, Jill. The Name of War. (New York: Alfred A. Knopf), 1998.
 Mayhew, Experience. "Family Religion Excited and Assisted" (1714–1728).
 Mayhew, Experience. "Indian Converts" (1727). (U. Mass. Press edition ), 2008. Indian Converts Collection
 Silverman, David. Faith and Boundaries: Colonists, Christianity, and Community Among the Wampanoag Indians of Martha's Vineyard, 1600–1871. New York: Cambridge University Press, 2007. .
 Waters, Kate, and Kendall, Russ. Tapenum's Day: A Wampanoag Indian Boy in Pilgrim Times. New York: Scholastic, 1996. .

External links

 Mashpee Wampanoag Tribe
 Wampanoag Tribe of Gay Head (Aquinnah)
 Wôpanâak Language Reclamation Project
 Plimoth Plantation – living history
 Chappaquiddick Wampanoag Tribe
 Pocasset Wampanoag Tribe of the Pokanoket Nation

 
Algonquian ethnonyms
Algonquian peoples
Indigenous peoples of the Northeastern Woodlands
King Philip's War
Martha's Vineyard
Nantucket, Massachusetts
Native American history of Massachusetts
Native American history of Rhode Island
Native American tribes in Massachusetts
Native American tribes in Rhode Island
Plymouth Colony